Vulpes riffautae is an extinct species of fox from the late Miocene of Chad (approximately 7 ma). Fossils of V. riffautae potentially represent the earliest record of the dog family, Canidae, in the Old World. V. riffautae was intermediate in size between Rüppell's fox (Vulpes rueppellii) and the fennec fox (V. zerda). The Mandible is narrow and shallow. Just before the posterior root of p2, the symphysis terminates. The masseteric fossa is rather deep. The posterior smaller mental foramen is located below the posterior root of p3, while the anterior larger mental foramen is located between the root of p1 and the anterior root of p2.

References

Prehistoric canines
Miocene mammals of Africa
Vulpes
Miocene canids
Fossil taxa described in 2007